José de Jesus Louzeiro (September 19, 1932 – December 29, 2017) was a Brazilian novelist, screenwriter and reporter.

Louzeiro was born in São Luís. He started working in 1948 as an intern at the newspaper O Imparcial. In 1953, when he was 21 years old, he moved to Rio de Janeiro where he worked on the magazine A Revista da Semana and O Jornal. Louzeiro also wrote for the newspapers Diário Carioca, Última Hora, Correio da Manhã, Folha and Diário do Grande ABC, as well for the magazine Manchete.  

Louzeiro first foray in literature was in 1958 with the short story Depois da Luta. His experience as a police reporter marked his literary production; Louzeiro's writing about real-life crime stories in a novelized way was compared to Truman Capote's nonfiction novels. Another books by Louzeiro are Lúcio Flávio, o passageiro da agonia (1975), Araceli, meu amor (1976) and  Infância dos mortos (1977). He also wrote children's books.

Louzeiro collaborated with film director Héctor Babenco, writing the screenplay for Lúcio Flávio, 1977 film adaptation of Lúcio Flávio, o passageiro da agonia. Infância dos mortos was also adapted to the movies, as the 1981 film Pixote.

Death
Louzeiro died on December 29, 2017, in Rio de Janeiro.

References

1932 births
2017 deaths
Brazilian biographers
20th-century Brazilian novelists
Brazilian screenwriters
20th-century Brazilian male writers
Brazilian male novelists
Male biographers
People from São Luís, Maranhão